Ho Chi Minh City University of Law (ULAW) is a university in Vietnam that offers undergraduate and postgraduate education in law and politics.

The university plays an important role as a legal research and advisory body for the Vietnamese government in legal and public administrative reform.

History
The University was established in 1996, pursuant to Decision N° 1234/GD&ĐT of the Ministry of Education and Training. It was originally merged with the Ho Chi Minh City branch of the Vietnam National University.

On October 10, 2000, the Prime Minister issued Decision N° 118/2000/QWĐ-TT, which separated the Ho Chi Minh City University of Law from the Vietnam National University.

It became the first Vietnamese legal training school to cooperate in a master's degree program with a foreign university (University of the West of England in Bristol, England).

The current rector is Doctor Mai Hồng Quỳ (2007-2018). Her predecessor was Doctor Nguyễn Văn Luyện (2000-2007).

Faculties and Departments
 Faculty of Management
 Faculty of Civil Law
 Faculty of Criminal Law
 Faculty of International Law
 Faculty of Commercial Law
 Faculty of Basic Studies
 Faculty of Legal English

International Programs
The Ho Chi Minh City University of Law has exchange agreements with more than 30 universities around the world and participates in a number of international exchange programs, such as Asia Campus, notably with the National University of Singapore or Nagoya University.
The University also offers French, English and Japanese LLB programs.

The University offers two international Master of Laws programs :

 an English LLM degree delivered by the University of the West of England
 a French Master of Laws with a major in International and Comparative Business Law delivered jointly by French Law Schools Jean Moulin University Lyon 3, Montesquieu University, and Toulouse 1 University Capitole.

Campus

The University currently has two campus:

 The main campus is located at 2 Nguyễn Tất Thành street, Ward 12 in district 4 and faces the Saigon River. It hosts the administration for the faculties and divisions, as well as the main library. It also hosts the student health care center, as well as a canteen.
 The second campus is located at No 123 National Road, Hiep Binh Chanh Ward, District Thu Duc. Brand new, it hosts a three-floor international library, lecture halls, as well as a student sports center.

Library

The Ho Chi Minh City University of Law library is one of the major law libraries in the South of Vietnam. The library has over 75.000 legal books, 63 newspapers and magazines, 1.000 PhD, MSc and BSc thesis.

The University has undertaken these past few years to develop its databases and electronic resources, and has implemented an e-Portal.

See also
 List of universities in Vietnam

Notes

External links
 Official Website of the University of Law

Universities in Ho Chi Minh City